Kandıra is a town and district of Kocaeli Province in the Marmara region of Turkey. Its neighbours are Kaynarca to the east, Adapazarı to the southeast, İzmit to the south and Şile to the west.

Geography
Kandıra has an area of 933 km2 (360,2 mi2). Of this area, almost 50% is used for agricultural purposes, while almost 40% is forested. Of the rest of the land, 4% is settled (buildings or roads and the remainder)

History
Kandıra is first mentioned as Kéndri or Kándora.

Hospital
The state hospital of Kandıra was founded in 1949.

Tourist attractions
Tourists discovered Kerpe when it was a small fishing port. It boasts a calm sea and sandy beaches, and is close to urban centers such as Istanbul, İzmit, and Adapazarı.

Kefken is 20 km away from Kandıra, and 8 km away from Kerpe. Kefken is the most advanced town among the coastal settlements of the district. Sea, beach and pine forests are the most important features. Kefken harbor is a typical fishing town. In the summertime the town gets 3 times crowded. 2 hours more or less, or 150 km away from Istanbul on the Black Sea coast, is this fairly secluded, quiet, and relatively unspoilt part of the region. The sea is suitable for swimming and there are unspoilt bays for picnics.
Kefken Island is one of the few islands on the Turkish Black Sea coast. The island is at a close distance to the shores of Cebeci village. Genoese era fortress walls and water wells are worth to mention as the historical heritage of the island.

Other places
Cebeci 
Kerpe
Kumcağız 
Bağırganli 
Kovanağzı 
Sarısu 
Dikili
Seyrek

References

External links
 District governor's official website 
 District municipality's official website 
 Kandira Hotel Guide

 
Populated places in Kocaeli Province
Districts of Kocaeli Province